Bos Sbov is a khum (commune) of Preah Netr Preah District in Banteay Meanchey Province in north-western Cambodia. Prior to 2008–2009 it belonged to the Serei Saophoan District.

Villages

 Trabaek
 Kandal
 Kouk Thum
 Bos Sbov
 Soutr Mont
 Srah Khtum
 Kabau
 Kbal Khting
 Smach
 Boeng Veaeng
 Bantoat Baoh
 Pring Kaong
 Khchas
 Khnhaer
 Khu Svay
 Khvav
 Tbaeng

References

Communes of Banteay Meanchey province
Preah Netr Preah District